Gymnastics was contested at the 2002 Asian Games in Busan, South Korea. Artistic gymnastics took place from October 1 to October 5. Rhythmic gymnastics took place on October 8 and 9. All Gymnastics events took place at Sajik Gymnasium.

Schedule

Medalists

Men's artistic

Women's artistic

Rhythmic

Medal table

Participating nations
A total of 116 athletes from 20 nations competed in gymnastics at the 2002 Asian Games:

References
 Artistic Results
 Rhythmic Results

External links
 Official website

 
2002 Asian Games events
2002
Asian Games
2002 Asian Games